This is a list of awards and nominations received by Def Leppard. The English rock band Def Leppard formed in 1977 as part of the new wave of British heavy metal movement.

American Music Awards
The American Music Awards is an annual awards ceremony created by Dick Clark in 1973.  Def Leppard has been nominated seven times overall due to the band's large popularity in the United States.

|-
| rowspan=2 align="center"|  ||Def Leppard|| Favorite Pop/Rock Band/Duo/Group || 
|-
|-
|Pyromania ||Favorite Pop/Rock Album || 
|-
|-
| rowspan=4 align="center"|  |||Def Leppard||Favorite Pop/Rock Band/Duo/Group  || 
|-
|-
|Hysteria|| Favorite Pop/Rock Album || 
|-
|-
|Def Leppard|| Favorite Heavy Metal/Hard Rock Artist || 
|-
|-
|Hysteria|| Favorite Heavy Metal/Hard Rock Album || 
|-
|-
| align="center"|  ||Def Leppard|| Favorite Heavy Metal/Hard Rock Artist || 
|-

Classic Rock Roll of Honour Awards

!Ref.
|-
| align="center" |2006 || Hysteria || Classic Album ||  || 
|-
| align="center" |2016 || Def Leppard || Album of the Year ||  ||
|-

CMT Music Awards
The CMT Music Awards is an awards show for country music videos. Def Leppard had 2 nominations in 2009 for a collaboration with Taylor Swift.

|-
| rowspan=2 align="center"| 2009 ||rowspan=2|"Photograph" (with Taylor Swift) || Wide Open Country Video of the Year|| 
|-
|-
| CMT Performance of the Year|| 
|-

Metal Hammer Golden Gods Awards

!Ref.
|-
| align="center"| 2009 || Def Leppard || Legends Award ||  ||  
|-

MTV Video Music Awards
The MTV Video Music Awards is an annual awards ceremony established in 1984 by MTV.  have Def Leppard received  six nomination overall.

|-
| rowspan=2 align="center"|  ||rowspan=2|"Pour Some Sugar On Me" || Best Heavy Metal Video || 
|-
|-
| Best Stage Performance in a Video || 
|-
|-
| rowspan=4 align="center"|  ||rowspan=4|"Let's Get Rocked" || Viewer's Choice   || 
|-
|-
| Best Metal/Hard Rock Video || 
|-
|-
| Best Special Effects || 
|-
|-
| Video of the Year || 
|-

Planet Rock Awards

! Ref.
|-
| align="center"| 2017 || Def Leppard || The Brick Wall Award ||  || 
|-

Rock and Roll Hall of Fame
The Rock and Roll Hall of Fame honors  artists, producers, engineers, and other notable figures who have influenced the development of rock music.  They were inducted into the 2019 Performer Category alongside The Cure, Janet Jackson, Stevie Nicks, Radiohead, Roxy Music and the Zombies on March 29, 2019.

! Ref.
|-
| align="center"| 2019 || Def Leppard || Rock and Roll Hall of Fame ||  || 
|-

References

Awards
Lists of awards received by British musician
Lists of awards received by musical group